The Organization of Yugoslav Nationalists ( ORJUNA; Организација Југославенских Националиста ОРЈУНА), was a political organization active in Kingdom of Serbs, Croats and Slovenes that existed from 1921 to 1929. ORJUNA supported Yugoslav nationalism, promoted the creation of a corporatist state, and opposed communism, democracy, separatism, Serbian and Croatian nationalism. It is believed to have been inspired by fascism of neighbouring Kingdom of Italy. 

It was created in Split, in 1921, in order to fight communist insurgencies and Croatian separatism, and later Italian and Austrian irredentism. The nominal leader was Milan Pribićević, brother of Yugoslav politician Svetozar Pribićević. The organization ceased to exist in 1929, after the 6 January Dictatorship was established by King Alexander I.

History

The ORJUNA was founded in March 1921 in Split by the royal administrator of Croatia and funded by the provincial government to secure Yugoslavia from threats posed by communists, separatists, and other persons deemed threatening to the state.  The first president was Marko Nani and the first secretary Edo Bulat. The first actions organized by JNNO were demonstrations against communists because of the communist assassination of the Minister of Interior Milorad Drašković. JNNO organized demonstrations in Split, Zagreb and Osijek. In Zagreb, JNNO members even demolished offices of newspapers that blamed the government for assassination.

It was particularly influential in areas of Slovenia and Croatia that were of interest to Italian and Austrian irredentism as well as in areas where ethnic minorities where viewed to be powerful or separatist, such as Hungarians in Vojvodina. The membership of the movement was ethnically mixed of the various Yugoslav nationalities. However most of its members were Croats from Dalmatia. It ran its own newspapers, had an academic club, a labour organization, a high school students wing "Young Yugoslavia", and a paramilitary organization, the Action Section.

After 1922 people of all age groups started to join the organization, which changed its name in May 1922 to ORJUNA. ORJUNA's main political goal was maintaining a unitary Yugoslav state. Its members clashed with Austrian and Italian border patrols. ORJUNA never participated directly in elections but its supporters voted for Yugoslav oriented parties. In 1929, when the King proclaimed his personal dictatorship and disbanded the parliament, ORJUNA supported the King's action, but because the King outlawed all political parties and organizations, the ORJUNA ceased to exist.

By 1925, ORJUNA's Action Groups accounted for 10,000 people.

Ideology
The primary ideological component of ORJUNA was integral Yugoslavism and establishing the corporatist state. The ORJUNA is believed to have been influenced by fascism in that like the original Italian Fascism, it had a similar organizational structure including a Yugoslav version of the Duce ("Leader"), titled Vođa and like Italian Fascism it glorified violence, including in its mottoes "Victory or Death" and "Whoever is not with us, is against us!". The organization was loyal to the Karađorđević dynasty.

See also
Yugoslav National Movement
Yugoslav Action
Association of Fighters of Yugoslavia
Yugoslav Radical Union

Notes

References
 
 
 
 

Kingdom of Yugoslavia
Organizations based in Yugoslavia
1921 establishments in Yugoslavia
Political parties established in 1921
Political parties disestablished in 1929
Yugoslavism
Anti-communist parties